Jadopur is a village in the south-central part of Bihiya block of Bhojpur district, Bihar, India. As of 2011, its population was 2,923, in 417 households.

References 

Villages in Bhojpur district, India